CSE may refer to:

Education

Examinations
 Certificate of Secondary Education, a secondary school qualification in the United Kingdom, replaced by the GCSE
 Civil Services Examination, an examination to qualify for government service in India

Field of study
 Cognitive systems engineering, the intersection of people, work, and technology, with a focus on safety-critical systems
 Computational science and engineering, the science and engineering of computation, usually associated with High Performance Computing
 Computer science and engineering, a degree program that combines aspects of both computer science and computer engineering program
 Control systems engineering, a field of engineering concerning how to design systems that reacts to input in desirable ways

Schools
 Chalmers School of Entrepreneurship, a school within Chalmers University of Technology and University of Gothenburg, Sweden
 Collège du Saint-Esprit, a Catholic, boys-only, secondary school based in Mauritius
 College of Saint Elizabeth, a Catholic liberal arts college in New Jersey, United States

Finance
 Calcutta Stock Exchange, India
 Canadian Securities Exchange, Toronto
 Casablanca Stock Exchange, Morocco
 Chittagong Stock Exchange, Bangladesh
 Cochin Stock Exchange, India
 Colombo Stock Exchange, a Sri Lankan stock exchange
 Copenhagen Stock Exchange, Denmark
 Cyprus Stock Exchange

Organisations

Companies
 Compañía Sevillana de Electricidad, a Spanish electricity generation company

Governmental
 Communications Security Establishment, a Canadian intelligence agency
 Combined Services Entertainment, official provider of live entertainment to the British Armed Forces
 Supreme Electoral Council (Nicaragua), the body that oversees elections in Nicaragua

Non-governmental
 Centre for Science and Environment, an Indian non-governmental organization
 Center for Sustainable Enterprise, a research center at the Illinois Institute of Technology
 Citizens for a Sound Economy, a conservative political group in the United States
 Conference of Socialist Economists, as an international, democratic membership organisation
 Corpus Speculorum Etruscorum, a project to publish all existing Etruscan mirrors
 Council of Science Editors, supports editorial practice among scientific writers
 Creation Science Evangelism, a Christian ministry of Kent Hovind

Science and medicine
 Chronic solvent-induced encephalopathy, a condition induced by long-term exposure to solvents
 Combined spinal and epidural anaesthesia, an anaesthetic technique
 CSE1, a yeast chromosome-segregation protein and member of the CAS/CSE protein family
 Cystathionine gamma-lyase, an enzyme

Technology
 Common subexpression elimination, a compiler optimization technique
 Collaborative search engine
 Comparison shopping engine, a shopping search engine that compares prices between shops
 Cell Supervision Electronics, part of a Battery management system

Other uses
 Commander of the Order of the Star of Ethiopia
 Circumstellar envelope, part of a star that is not gravitationally bound to the star core
 Clube Sociedade Esportiva, a Brazilian football (soccer) club
 Comprehensive sex education, an instruction method
 ISO 639:cse, Czech Sign Language
 Crime Scene Examiner, a scenes of crime officer in the United Kingdom
 Child sexual exploitation